Hamburg Public Library may refer to:

Hamburg Public Library (Hamburg, Iowa), listed on the National Register of Historic Places in Iowa
Hamburg Public Library (Hamburg, Pennsylvania), listed on the National Register of Historic Places in Berks County, Pennsylvania